The Bear River Range (also known as the Bear River Mountains), is a mountain range located in northeastern Utah and southeastern Idaho in the western United States.



Description
The range forms the eastern boundary of the Cache Valley. U.S. Highway 89 via Logan Canyon provides the only major route through the mountains, and the canyon is the location of Logan River, the Beaver Mountain ski resort, and Tony Grove Lake.

See also

 List of mountain ranges of Utah
 List of mountains in Utah
 List of mountains of Idaho
 List of mountain peaks of Idaho
 List of mountain ranges in Idaho

References

External links

Bear River (Great Salt Lake)
Mountain ranges of Idaho
Mountain ranges of Utah
Mountain ranges of Cache County, Utah
Mountain ranges of Rich County, Utah
Landforms of Bear Lake County, Idaho
Landforms of Caribou County, Idaho
Landforms of Franklin County, Idaho
Wasatch-Cache National Forest
Wasatch Range